Miguel Augusto Rodríguez Garrido is a Venezuelan actor and model born in Caracas on 20 October 1977. He has appeared in several telenovelas for RCTV and Venevisión.

He began his career modelling for a famous agency in Caracas. His acting career began when he went for a casting call conducted by RCTV. He was then given a scholarship to study acting at Luz Columba RCTV's acting school. He studied under acting professor Ospino, and this is the time he discovered his passion for acting.

His first acting role was in the telenovela La mujer de Judas in 2003. He has also acted in telenovelas in the United States such as Sacrificio de Mujer for Venevisión International and Aurora and La Casa de al Lado for Telemundo.

In 2012, he returned to Venezuela to play the role of Eulogio Parra in the telenovela Válgame Dios.

Telenovelas
2013: De todas maneras Rosa (Venevisión) as Eduardo Revete
2012: Válgame Dios (Venevisión) as Eulogio Parra
2011: La Casa de al Lado (Telemundo) as Omar Blanco
2011: Sacrificio de Mujer (Venevisión International) as Jorge
2010: Aurora (Telemundo) as Dr. Williams
2007: Toda una dama (RCTV) as Lucas Gallardo
2005: Amor a Palos (RCTV) as Beltrán Ponce De León
2004: Estrambotica Anastasia (RCTV) as Leon Borofsky Castellanos "El Monje Asesino"
2003: La mujer de Judas (RCTV) as Pitercito
2002: Trapos íntimos (RCTV) as Chato

References

External links

Living people
1977 births
People from Caracas
21st-century Venezuelan male actors
Venezuelan male telenovela actors
Venezuelan male models